Fuyu, formerly Fuyu County, is a county-level city in northwestern Jilin province, People's Republic of China, under the administration of the prefecture-level city of Songyuan, and is Songyuan's easternmost county-level division. The county seat is located in the town of Sanchahe. The city name comes from Buyeo (Fuyu), an ancient kingdom located in parts of Northeast China.

Administrative divisions

Fuyu is divided into nine towns and 17 townships.

Towns:
Sanchahe, Wujiadian, Sanjingzi, Caijiagou, Gongpengzi, Zengsheng, Changchunling, Taolaizhao, Xinwanfa

Townships:
Sanyi Township, Yongping Township, Xiaojia Township, Erlongshan Township, Shiqiao Township, Yijiadian Township, Xujiadian Township, Gengxin Township, Dalinzi Township, Xinzhan Township, Simajia Township, Sheli Township, Xinchengju Township, Dasanjiazi Township, Yushugou Township, Qijiazi Township, Lalin Township

Climate
Fuyu has a monsoon-influenced, humid continental climate (Köppen Dwa), with long (lasting from November to March), very cold, windy, but dry winters, and hot, humid summers. Over two-thirds of the annual precipitation falls from June to August alone.

References

External links

County-level divisions of Jilin